The Puy-de-Dôme General Council (French: Conseil général du Puy-de-Dôme) is the deliberative assembly of the Puy-de-Dôme department. 
It consists of sixty-one members (general councilors) and its headquarters are 
in Clermont-Ferrand, capital of the department, and the president is Jean-Yves Gouttebel. 
The general councillors are elected for a six-year term. The Puy-de-Dôme General Council includes 15 vice-presidents. 
The General Council has a logo.

President  
The president of the General Council is currently Jean-Yves Gouttebel.

Vice-presidents 
 Jean-Yves Bony
 Sylvie Lachaize
 Bernard Delcros

General councilors  
The General Council consists of 61 general councilors (conseillers généraux) who come from the 30 cantons of Puy-de-Dôme.

See also  
 Puy-de-Dôme 
 General councils of France

Website  

  Puy-de-Dôme General Council

Puy-de-Dôme
Departmental councils (France)

fr:Conseil général du Puy-de-Dôme